Ada Jane Macnab (1889–1980) known as Chica Macnab, and later as Ada Munro, was a Scottish artist notable as a wood-engraver and painter.

Biography
Macnab was born in the Philippines in the province of Iloilo where her Scottish parents were based while her father worked for the Hong Kong and Shanghai Bank. When the family returned to Scotland, Macnab was educated at Kilmacolm before studying at the Glasgow School of Art from 1922 to 1925. She became a founding member of the Glasgow-based Society of Artist Printers and as soon as she graduated, the Glasgow School employed Macnab to establish and run a class on lithography and colour block printing. Macnab only taught the class for a year, during 1926 and 1927, but her students included Alison Mackenzie. She remained in Glasgow and joined the Glasgow Society of Lady Artists. In 1927 Macnab married James Munro, a chemist, and after she started to raise a family appears to have put her artistic career on hold. After 1967 she returned to painting and exhibited several oil paintings as Ada Munro. Her brother was also an artist, the painter and printmaker Iain Macnab.

References

1889 births
1980 deaths
20th-century British printmakers
20th-century engravers
20th-century Scottish painters
20th-century Scottish women artists
Academics of the Glasgow School of Art
Alumni of the Glasgow School of Art
Artists from Glasgow
People from Iloilo
Scottish women painters
Scottish wood engravers
Sibling artists
Women engravers
British expatriates in the Philippines